The 1931 USSR Chess Championship was the 7th edition of USSR Chess Championship. Held from 10 October to 11 November in Moscow. The tournament was won by the future world champion Mikhail Botvinnik. The competition had the largest number of players up to that edition and had an extensive set of preliminary qualifiers in which about 500 players took part.

Table and results

References 

USSR Chess Championships
Championship
Chess
1931 in chess
Chess